Ribisi is an Italian surname. Notable people with the surname include:

Giovanni Ribisi (born 1974), American film and television actor
Marissa Ribisi (born 1974), American actress, twin sister of Giovanni

Italian-language surnames